Peter Kaim-Caudle (1916 in Breslau – 18 May 2010 in Paris) was Professor of Social Policy at Durham University and a recognised expert on the provision of social services.

Life and career
Peter Robert Kaim was born in Breslau
to a middle-class German Jewish family on 14 December 1916. In 1933 he left the increasingly anti-semitic German Reich for England, where he studied economics at the LSE.He graduated in 1939 and went to work in business.

During World War II he was interned for fifteen months as an enemy alien, at first in the Isle of Man and later in Canada. His career in education began with the arranging of and teaching informal classes for fellow internees. After the war he returned to Britain and married Londoner Patricia Caudle a former landgirl and later English teacher. The couple adopted the new surname Kaim-Caudle  and had four children.

Peter began his post-war career as a lecturer at the University of Dundee, then in 1950 moved to the University of Durham where he spent the rest of his professional life. He became the University's first Professor of Social Administration. and authored many papers for British and overseas journals on social service provision, particularly pensions and subsidised health care. From 1963 he collaborated with and made frequent visits to the Economic and Social Research Institute in Dublin. His contributions to Irish social policy research were recognised by the award in 2002 of the honorary degree of D.Litt. from the National University of Ireland, Maynooth.

Kaim died at his daughter's home in Le Vésinet, Paris on 18 May 2010.

Published books

References

1916 births
2010 deaths
Academics of social policy
Academics of Durham University
Writers from Wrocław
People from the Province of Silesia
Jewish emigrants from Nazi Germany to the United Kingdom
People interned in the Isle of Man during World War II